The 1920–21 Ljubljana Subassociation League was the second season of the Ljubljana Subassociation League. The league was separated into Celje, Ljubljana and Maribor subdivisions. The final was played between the previous season winners Ilirija from Ljubljana, and Athletik from Celje. Ilirija defeated Athletik in the final and won their second title in a row.

Celje subdivision

Ljubljana subdivision

Maribor subdivision

Semi-final

Final

References

External links
Football Association of Slovenia 

Slov
Slov
Slovenian Republic Football League seasons
football
football